Foresterhill is an area in the city of Aberdeen, Scotland. It is the site of the city's main hospitals (Aberdeen Royal Infirmary, the Royal Aberdeen Children's Hospital and the Aberdeen Maternity Hospital), as well as the medical school and medical science departments of the University of Aberdeen. It is the largest hospital complex in Europe.

Foresterhill is situated at the highest point in the city, a site identified by Professor Matthew Hay in 1900. He had the vision of an integrated medical campus, with a combined hospital and medical school for the City of Aberdeen.

The site has its own helicopter landing site due to the hospitals' roles as tertiary hospitals for the North of Scotland and the rurality of Grampian as a catchment area, plus this is the primary emergency hospital for the offshore industries.

Hospitals at Foresterhill 
Aberdeen Maternity Hospital
Aberdeen Royal Infirmary
Royal Aberdeen Children's Hospital

Buildings at Foresterhill

Notable university buildings
Institute of Applied Health Sciences
Institute of Medical Sciences
Medico-Chirurgical Hall
Polwarth Building — main building of Aberdeen Medical School
Suttie Centre — Teaching & Learning Centre
Rowett Institute of Nutrition and Health

Other buildings 
Blood Transfusion Centre — run by the Scottish National Blood Transfusion Service
Central Stores Complex
Foresterhill Health Centre
National Hyperbaric Centre
Anchor Centre for haematology, oncology and radiotherapy is on site but will be open in 2023.

See also
Matthew Hay
NHS Grampian
The Robert Gordon University
University of Aberdeen

External links
Map of Foresterhill, provided by NHS Grampian

References

Areas of Aberdeen
Health in Aberdeen